Jackson Township is a township in Madison County, Iowa, in the United States.

History
Jackson Township was organized in 1860.

References

Townships in Madison County, Iowa
Townships in Iowa
1860 establishments in Iowa